Abraham Revusky (1889 – February 8, 1946) was a Russian Empire-born, US-based politician, author and editor. He was a contributing editor to the Jewish Morning Journal, and the author of several books.

Life
Revusky was born in 1889 in Smila, in the Cherkassky Uyezd of the Kiev Governorate of the Russian Empire (present-day Ukraine). He grew up in Russia and Austria.

Revusky joined the Poale Zion party in Ukraine in the early 1910s. He moved to Odessa, where he was "an administrative member of the Jewish community" during the Russian Revolution of 1917, and the Ukrainian minister of Jewish Affairs for the Directorate of Ukraine in 1918. He lived in Palestine, later known as Israel, from 1920 to 1921, and he was a co-founder of the Histadrut. He was expelled from Mandatory Palestine by the British government in 1921, and he lived in Berlin until 1924, when he emigrated to the United States.

Revusky authored books in Yiddish and English, including a memoir of his time in Ukraine and a non-fiction book about Jews in Israel. He was also a contributing editor to the Jewish Morning Journal.

Revusky died on February 8, 1946, at his residence in Yonkers, New York, at age 58, leaving an estate valued at $8,812.

Selected works

References

External links
Abraham Revusky on the Internet Archive

1889 births
1946 deaths
People from Smila
People from Cherkassky Uyezd
Jews from the Russian Empire
Emigrants from the Russian Empire to the United States
People from Yonkers, New York
Yiddish-language writers
Jewish ministers of Ukraine
Ashkenazi Jews in Mandatory Palestine
Writers from New York (state)
20th-century American memoirists
Poale Zion politicians